The Sosan Hotel(서산호텔) is a hotel located in Pyongyang, North Korea. It was built in 1989. The hotel has a golf range.

The hotel was renovated in 2015 to commemorate the 70th anniversary of the founding of the  Workers’ Party of Korea.

See also 

 List of hotels in North Korea

References 

Hotels in Pyongyang
Hotel buildings completed in 1989
Skyscrapers in North Korea
Skyscraper hotels
Hotels established in 1989
1989 establishments in North Korea
20th-century architecture in North Korea